Rydell & Quick is a Swedish rock band featuring male vocalist Christer Rydell and female vocalist and saxophonist Malin Quick. Rydell had formed a band with Peer Stappe, Rydell Rip Offs, playing locally, while Quick performed with big bands. The band was originally formed in 1989 after Quick joined Rydell's band on stage with her instrument. The band has toured extensively around Sweden and since 1999 are sponsored by Harley-Davidson. The band also features two drummers Berndt Baumgartner and Peer Stappe and the bass player Jonas Bonnier. The band has released two albums, R.O.C.K.O.H.O.L.I.C (2006) and R.O.A.D.T.R.I.P.(2012). Their first album was described as " catchy, feel-good, melodic hard rock". Both are from the Västra Götaland area of Sweden and live in Borås.

Members
Christer Rydell (vocals, guitar)
Malin Quick (vocals, saxophone)
Jonas Bonnier (bass)
Berndt Baumgartner (drums)
Peer Stappe (drums)

Discography

Albums

Singles

References

Swedish musical groups